Gösta Gunvald Eriksson (born 26 January 1931) is a retired Swedish rower who competed in the 1956 and 1960 Summer Olympics.

Early life 
Eriksson was born on January 26, 1931, in Little Skee, Sweden, outside Strömstad.

Career

Olympic Competitions 
In the 1956 Summer Olympics, held in Melbourne, Australia and Stockholm, Sweden, he won a silver medal in the coxed four and finished fourth in the eight competition. Four years later, at the 1960 Summer Olympics, held in Rome, Italy, he and his partner Lennart Hansson were eliminated in the repechage of the coxed pair event and in the first round of the coxless pair competition.

European Championship 
Eriksson won two more silver medals at the 1955 European Championships, in the coxed four and eight.

References

1931 births
Living people
Swedish male rowers
Olympic rowers of Sweden
Rowers at the 1956 Summer Olympics
Rowers at the 1960 Summer Olympics
Olympic silver medalists for Sweden
Olympic medalists in rowing
Medalists at the 1956 Summer Olympics
European Rowing Championships medalists
20th-century Swedish people